Grandvilliers is the name of two communes in France:

Grandvilliers, Eure
Grandvilliers, Oise